Adam and the Amethysts was a Canadian indie rock band formed in Montreal in 2004. The band was fronted by Adam Waito, a former member of Miracle Fortress. The band released two albums and toured mostly around North America.

History
Waito was born in Manitouwadge, Ontario, raised in Thunder Bay, Ontario and moved to Montreal in the early 2000s. He co-founded Telefauna in 2004, an indie-pop band whose that played the Pop Montreal festival three times. They released Their 1st EP in 2005 and a single "Under the Underground Water" b/w "Bamboo Shoot" in 2007.

Waito launched Adam and the Amethysts with the release of Amethyst Amulet on June 10, 2008, on Pome Records. The album was an ode to Waito's home town, referencing 60s pop and Neil Young. For this album, it was reported that guest artists included members of Telefauna and The Luyas, but they are not credited.

After the release of Amethyst Amulet the band underwent some lineup changes while continuing to play festivals like Pop Montreal, and Halifax Pop Explosion. They also opened for Land of Talk.

The band's second album, Flickering Flashlight, was released on 4 October 2011, on Kelp Records. The song "Prophecy" from this album was featured on the soundtrack of Curfew, which won the 2012 Academy Award for Best Live Action Short Film. The band, now a trio, went on a short Canadian tour. In 2012, they played Canadian Music Week and the South by Southwest festival in Texas.

In 2013 Lessard and Waito formed the duo Silverkeys. In 2014 Waito joined Ohara Hale and Jeremy MacCuish to form the trio Nancy Pants.

In 2013, the Adam and the Amethysts song "Dreaming" appeared in the film What If.

Discography
 2008: Amethyst Amulet (Pome)
 2011: Flickering Flashlight (Kelp)

References

Citations

External links
 

Musical groups established in 2004
Musical groups disestablished in 2012
Musical groups from Montreal
Canadian indie rock groups
English-language musical groups from Quebec
2004 establishments in Quebec
2012 disestablishments in Quebec